Egon Stephansen (born 22 October 1934) is a Danish former sports shooter. He competed in the 300 metre rifle, three positions and 50 metre rifle, prone events at the 1960 Summer Olympics.

References

External links
 

1934 births
Living people
Danish male sport shooters
Olympic shooters of Denmark
Shooters at the 1960 Summer Olympics
People from Vejle Municipality
Sportspeople from the Region of Southern Denmark